The 1967 South American Football Championship was won by hosts Uruguay, with Argentina finished second. Brazil and Peru withdrew from the tournament. It was the first tournament in which Venezuela participated.

Qualifying round 

Chile won 5–2 on aggregate and qualified for the Copa América 1967.

Paraguay won 5–3 on aggregate and qualified for the Copa América 1967.

Venues

Squads

Final round

Result

Goal scorers 
With five goals, Luis Artime of Argentina was the top scorer in the tournament. In total, 49 goals were scored by 27 different players, with only one of them credited as own goal.

5 goals
  Luis Artime
4 goals
  Jorge Oyarbide
3 goals

  Julio Gallardo
  Rubén Marcos
  José Urruzmendi
  Pedro Rocha
  Rafael Santana

2 goals

  Raúl Bernao
  Pedro Araya
  Celino Mora
  Juan Carlos Rojas
  Antonio Ravelo

1 goal

  Juan Carlos Carone
  Juan Carlos Sarnari
  Oscar Mas
  Rafael Albrecht
  Silvio Marzolini
  Antonio González
  Arístides Del Puerto
  Benigno Apocada
  Juan Francisco Riveros
  Ramón Colmán
  Domingo Pérez
  Julio Montero Castillo
  Humberto Scovino
  Luis Mendoza

Own goal
  Roberto Troncoso (playing against Uruguay)

External links 
 South American Championship 1967 at RSSSF

 
1967
1967 in South American football
1967
South
January 1967 sports events in South America
February 1967 sports events in South America
Sports competitions in Montevideo
1960s in Montevideo